The Saarland Order of Merit is the highest award of the German State of Saarland.  Established on 10 December 1974, the order is presented in recognition for outstanding service to Saarland by the Minister-President of Saarland.  Awarded in a single class, in the form of an Officer's Cross (Steckkreuz), the insignia of the order is a blue enameled four-armed eight pointed Maltese cross.  In the center of the cross is a silver medallion bearing the wreathed Coat of arms of Saarland.

Notable recipients
Dieter Thomas Heck
Jean-Claude Juncker
Nicole Seibert

References

External links 
 Der Saarländische Verdienstorden
 Sechs Persönlichkeiten mit dem Saarländischen Verdienstorden ausgezeichnet

Saarland
Saarland
Culture of Saarland